The AK-176 is a Soviet  naval gun mounted in an enclosed turret, that may be used against sea, coastal, and aerial targets, including low flying anti-ship missiles.  The system is designed to arm small displacement ships and comprises the Gun Mount with a MR-123-02/76 Fire Control Radar System.  It has high survivability owing to autonomous use of the gun mount controlled from the optical sight in the absence of control from the radar system, as well as a capability for fire even if power supply is lost.

Design
The gun is fed by 152 ready to fire rounds and has selectable rates of fire of 30, 60 and 120 rounds per minute. The 120 r.p.m. rate is achieved by firing a burst of 75, but afterwards the gun has to cool off for 30 minutes.  The AK-176 is effective against missiles, being able to shoot down AT-2 Swatter (simulating a Harpoon anti-ship missile), taking an average of 25 rounds per kill.

In the late 1980s an upgraded version the AK-176M, with a new fire control system MR-123-02, television targeting and a laser rangefinder, was introduced. This gun, is still in production (AK-176M1) and is the primary medium-caliber artillery systems to all small Soviet ships and is widely exported.

AK-176MA, a further upgrade of the design intended for newer ship classes, such as the Karakurt-class corvettes and project 22160-class patrol ships, completed its trials in 2017. The AK-176MA features improved accuracy, a stealthy turret design, and a significantly reduced weight of under 9 tonnes. It will replace older guns on carrier ships on the process of their modernization.

The equivalent NATO system is the Otobreda 76 mm, another 120 rpm 3 inches gun, but the Soviet weapon predated it by several years, being in service since late '70s, while the 3rd gen Oto was ready around the mid '80s.

H/PJ-26

The 713th Institute (also known as Zhengzhou Electrical Engineering Research Institute) of China Shipbuilding Industry Corporation (CSIC) of the People's Republic of China has developed a Chinese variant of AK-176, with Mr. Chen Dingfeng (陈汀峰) as the general designer. Design begun in 2000 and was completed in 2003.  The primary difference between this H/PJ-26 and AK-176 is that the Chinese variant adopts a stealthy turret design, and more composite material is used in the construction of the turret. In addition, ready rounds for the H/PJ-26 are doubled to 150 rounds from the original 75 of the AK-176.

Operators

Current

Past users

See also
AK-726
AK-100 (naval gun)

Gallery

References

External links 

http://www.navweaps.com/Weapons/WNRussian_3-60_ak176.htm

Naval anti-aircraft guns
Cold War artillery of the Soviet Union
Anti-aircraft guns of the Soviet Union
Naval guns of the Soviet Union
Autocannons of the Soviet Union
Nizhny Novgorod Machine-building Plant products